is a male Japanese utaite musician and YouTuber.

Biography

Early life 
Amatsuki was born on 30 June 1991 in Tokyo, Japan. During his childhood, he dreamed of becoming a Kamen rider. When he was young, he was bullied at school, and he struggled to build trusting friendships. He liked to sing and was enthusiastic about listening to music from his favorite movies and video games. At that time, he liked Porno Graffitti songs such as the first CD ever bought. Akimitsu Honma music producer he is currently also affiliated.  Since 2007, He has posted "Singing" (歌ってみた) videos for people who are active on Niconico, a video posting site. Sometimes he watched the distribution of Tonari no Sakata, Tomohisa Sakou, Kuroneko and Shima.

2014-Present: Career 
In high school life after he joining the baseball club, He was in charge of vocals for the school festival in a friend's band. From 2009, He bought an inexpensive Skype microphone himself and started broadcasting live broadcasts amid mixed expectations and tensions. In 2010, He posted the cover of the Vocaloid song (Tried to sing) for the first time Started activities as a singer (Utaite) When He just starting out, He worried about his singing ability, but He will continue to work harder to improve. At first, He hadn't imagined an activity like singing on the stage, but through activities such as video sites, He expanded my network with popularity and participated in the live performances of other singers for the first time in 2010. At that time, He was going to college with the aim of becoming a childcare worker, but it is a common attraction of distribution and music. He attracted to the part where the sender and the receiver can enjoy each other and will gradually think about the way to music. In addition, four people who deepened the relationship in the video site etc. (Such as Hashiyan, Kashitarō Itō, Un:c, Circle of friends (COF) from 2012 to 2016 with Connie) as a live tour. With the first solo live in 2012, He released music face-to-face with the audience, not just the number of times the video is played . Realize the sense of unity with the people in front and the appeal of mutual communication. In the same year, he released his first CD (Melodic note.). He made his debut with the major first album Hello, World! From music label King Records on July 16, 2014, when he started posting videos on YouTube. In 2015, the album was released in the unit with Hashiyan (melost).

In 2016, he released his 2nd album (Hakoniwa Dramatic) centered on "dramatic" in his life. He also writes and composes some songs. Since then, his tie-ups with video works (such as the Digimon series OP that he was a fan of when he was a child) and live activities, Participation in festivals, etc. As he accumulate activities in various formats, He is expanding the audience and age group, and he also expanding the frontage to the male group. In June 2018, the 3rd album that cuts out romance from various perspectives was announced. (It must have been love) In addition to the music, the white background and blue roses on the Record sleeve jacket also have meaning. On August 23, the same year, He held a solo live at Nippon Budokan and realized his dream. Looking back on his half-life and activities, he wanted like to thank all the people who supported and participated in his activities as well as every live concert. He moved to Universal Music Japan in November 2018. In July 2019, the 10th anniversary live will be held at Osaka-jō Hall, Tour performances at Tokyo International Forum Hall A, from December to January, He shared the 10-year history and the miracle of encounters in his activities.

In April 2020, To commemorate the 10th anniversary of the activity, He were planning to hold a one-man live for two days at the Makuhari Event Hall, After announcing the cancellation of the postponed performance due to the influence of the COVID-19, Held on August 29 and 30 at the same venue as a live without audience A total of about 50,000 people watched it in two days. On December 30, a live performance without audience was held at Tokyo International Forum Hall A.

As a viewer and an artist, he enjoys release music. Since his major debut, he has been releasing CDs in cooperation with the label, but as with the beginning of the activity, his desire to released music along with the video has not changed, and he continues to post regular videos and live broadcasts on Nico Nico Douga and YouTube. Deepening friendships with friends He met during his singer activities (Such as Mafumafu, Eve and Other) he might collaborate with each other, compose music, and provide music. In addition to live performances overseas, He expanding the range of activities such as voice actors, plays, recitation plays, and TV appearances. In July 2021, he joined the professional gaming team Crazy Raccoon as a streamer.

Discography

Single

Album

Major Album

Mini Album

References

External links 
 
 
 
 

1991 births
Living people
Japanese male singers
Musicians from Tokyo
Universal Music Japan artists
Utaite
Japanese YouTubers